Bennet Veetraag are an Indian music composer duo in the Malayalam film industry. The duo consists of guitarist-songwriter Bennet and singer-musician Veetraag.

Early years and career
Bennet and Veetraag hail from the city of Kozhikode, Kerala, India. Bennet Roland is a guitarist and songwriter with his musical training based in the Classical music (Western), broadened through exposure to other various genres, fusion, and Indian forms of music like the Ghazal. He is also popular through his fusion band called Bennet and the Band that features various frontline singers from the Indian film industry. Veetraag is a singer musician who was initially trained in Carnatic classical music and later developed a keen interest and proficiency in diverse genres of music, including Hindustani classical. They debuted with the hit soundtrack for Malayalam campus film Out of Syllabus. The songs "Poi Varuvaan" and "Ee Kalppadavil" were notable successes. Their next works, Sooryakireedam (2007) and Dr. Patient (2009) were also noted works. In 2011, the duo worked for Kamal's drama movie Gadhama, which won them critical praise and immediate success.

"Bennet Veetraag" won best music director award in Thikkurissi awards instituted by Thikkurissi foundation for the movie Gadhama

Discography

References

External links
 Bennet Veetraag at the Malayalam Movie Database

Malayalam film score composers
Musicians from Kozhikode
Living people
Indian musical duos
Film musicians from Kerala
21st-century Indian composers
Year of birth missing (living people)